Airheart is an action game designed and programmed by Dan Gorlin for the Apple II and published by Broderbund in 1986. It requires a 128K Apple IIe (or later) to run, as it uses the 16-color double hi-res graphics mode. After three years of development, the game was technically advanced at its time of release, using scaled sprites for 3D effects, but did not include all of the planned features. Gorlin reworked the game as Typhoon Thompson in Search for the Sea Child for the Atari ST (1988), and later the Amiga (1990), which is closer to what he originally envisioned.

Gameplay
The name Airheart is the title the player aspires to earn.  The user controls a jet-propelled flotation device. They must navigate their craft and fight robotic defenders. Spirit guardians instruct the player to collect certain items, such as a sword or a goblet, which are needed for a final battle to free an infant boy prince.

Development
Gorlin had great success with his first title, Choplifter, which he developed in six months. Airheart took about three years to develop.  This is in large part because he also developed other games which he lost interest in and never completed and also because he did a lot of research and built a number of tools to help in game development.

Gorlin was unable to include all the features he planned. At one point, for example, he had tunnel and underwater levels working, but was unable to complete them due to time constraints.  Tunnels and islands, in fact, were key elements of his original vision for the game, but had to be scrapped, being too ambitious for the time.

The largest version of each sprite was created by hand, then Gorlin used proprietary tools to create the roughly twenty smaller versions.  Storing these sprites in RAM, he was able to simulate scaling in realtime. Though the sprites used a lot of memory, it was the only method that satisfied Gorlin since he hated the low-polygon look of other contemporary games.

Jordan Mechner visited Gorlin in 1986 and saw the final version of the game. He wrote in his journal "It’s got some staggering special effects and it’s no 
fun at all to play."

Reception

References

1986 video games
Action video games
Apple II games
Apple II-only games
Broderbund games
North America-exclusive video games
Video games about robots
Video games developed in the United States
Single-player video games